The Dutch Amateur Radio Emergency Service (DARES), which was founded on 12 May 2004, is a non-profit organization made out of licensed radio amateurs in the Netherlands. DARES participants are able to set up a national, continental or international radio network in case of an emergency situation, like a power outage on a large scale, a flooding, a cyber attack causing severe damage to communication networks, or other emergency situations, where the safety of a large group of people are in danger.

Regions
The DARES board (consisting of a few persons) has assigned 25 Safety regions, which are also used by other emergency services in the Netherlands:

 NNL - North Netherlands (R1, R2, R3, R4) - Groningen, Friesland, Drenthe, Northwest Overijssel
 R5 - 
 R6 - 
 R7 - 
 R8 - 
 R9 - 
 R10 - 
 R11 - 
 R12 - 
 R13 - 
 R14 -  (now R25)
 R15 - 
 R16 -  (now R15)
 R17 - 
 R18 - 
 R19 - 
 R20 - 
 R21 - 
 R22 - 
 R23 - 
 R24 - 
 R25 - 

Every region has its own Region Coordinator (RC), which keeps their region trained.

See also
 Amateur radio
 Amateur Radio Emergency Service
 Emergency communication

References

Amateur radio
Amateur radio emergency communications organizations